Rushka Bergman is a Serbian American artist, fashion editor and film director. She is best known for being the personal stylist of American singer Michael Jackson and acted as creative consultant and costume designer for his This Is It concerts in London. She is currently the creative consultant of rapper Nicki Minaj.

Background
Bergman was born in Serbia, and received her degree from the University of Belgrade Faculty of Economics. Shortly thereafter she moved to Ghana and continued her education in fine art. She is now based in New York City.

Career 
After moving to New York in 1996, Bergman began working as a stylist immediately. In 2000, she participated in the creation of the Giorgio Armani exhibit in collaboration with The Guggenheim Museum and Royal Academy of Arts in London.  She also worked with photographer Tom Munro on the accompanying book, Giorgio Armani, for which she helped to create the cover as well as many of the images inside. In 2004, Bergman collaborated with Bryan Adams on Calvin Klein's book American Women, where she styled some of America's most unforgettable women, including former Secretary of State Hillary Clinton. Bergman often collaborates with filmmaker/photographer Francesco Carrozzini.  She was the costume designer for his short film 1937 which was selected at the 2008 Venice Film Festival. Bergman has worked for many years as a contributing fashion editor at Vogue Italia and L'Uomo Vogue and has styled over 80 covers to date.

Her notable subjects include musicians such as Michael Jackson, Madonna, Jay-Z, Beyoncé, Nicki Minaj, Zayn Malik, Sting, David Byrne, Björk, Kanye West, Frank Ocean, Usher, Sean Combs, A$AP Rocky, and Snoop Dogg; directors Steven Spielberg, Tim Burton, David Cronenberg, David Lynch, Quentin Tarantino, Ang Lee, Oliver Stone, Bennett Miller, Stephen Frears, Wong Kar-Wai, Darren Aronofsky, and David Fincher; actors Robert De Niro, Morgan Freeman, Christoph Waltz, Mickey Rourke, Tim Roth, Samuel L. Jackson, Robert Downey Jr., Robert Pattinson, Michael Fassbender, Jake Gyllenhaal, Shia LaBeouf, Gerard Butler, Hugh Jackman, Keira Knightley, Alec Baldwin, Stephen Dorff, Taylor Lautner, Mark Ruffalo, Ben Stiller, Daniel Radcliffe, Tobey Maguire, Dane DeHaan, Sarah Gadon, Kim Kardashian, and Shailene Woodley; notable athletes Kobe Bryant, Serena Williams and Neymar da Silva; entrepreneurs Mark Parker, Richard Branson, Charles Annenberg, David Rockefeller, Evan Spiegel, and Jimmy Wales; and artists including Jeff Koons, Marina Abramović, Peter Marino, Rem Koolhaas, Andres Serrano, Shepard Fairey, Ole Scheeren, Sir Jonathan Ive, Shirin Neshat, and Ed Ruscha. 

Bergman has worked on beauty campaigns for Shiseido and L'Oreal as well as advertising campaigns for Valentino, Pringle of Scotland, Bally, and Mango, amongst others. In 2011, she appeared on America's Next Top Model as a guest stylist for a Michael Jackson-themed photo shoot. In 2014, she was awarded the Nikola Tesla Visual Arts Achievement Award by the Tesla Science Foundation. Bergman received Elle Serbia's International Style Icon award, in November 2015.

Michael Jackson 
After meeting Michael Jackson on the set of his 2007 L'Uomo Vogue cover shoot with Bruce Weber, Bergman began to work as Jackson's creative consultant and stylist, and the two became close friends. In addition to being his personal stylist, Bergman collaborated on his costumes for the This Is It concerts with haute couture designers Christophe Decarnin for Balmain, Kris Van Assche for Christian Dior, John Galliano, Riccardo Tisci for Givenchy, and Giuseppe Zanotti.

Nicki Minaj
Rushka Bergman began styling rapper Nicki Minaj on 24 August 2014 for the 2014 MTV Video Music Awards. Since then, they've continued to collaborate on fashion editorials for Vogue Italia, L'Uomo Vogue, Rolling Stone, Billboard and The New York Times, and the Roberto Cavalli Spring/Summer 2015 campaign. Bergman was the creative director of costume design for Nicki Minaj's 2015 European and American The Pinkprint Tour. Bergman has continued to style Nicki Minaj for ongoing TV appearances on The Tonight Show, The View, Saturday Night Live, Good Morning America; and award shows such as: The 2014 MTV Europe Music Awards, The 2015 American Music Awards, The 2015 Grammy Awards, and The 2015 MTV Video Music Awards.

After a couple of years of not styling Minaj, Bergman returned styling Minaj in 2021, styling her in her music video for her collaboration with American rapper Lil Baby titled "Do We Have a Problem?".

Filmography

Awards

 In 2014, Bergman was awarded the Nikola Tesla Visual Arts Achievement Award by the Tesla Science Foundation.
 In 2015, Bergman received Elle Serbia's International Style Icon award.
In 2017, The Nicki Minaj Cover of The New York Times Magazine won the top prize at the Society of Publication Designers (SPD) Awards

References

External links
 
 
Facebook

American people of Serbian descent
Fashion editors
Fashion stylists
Italian editors
Italian magazine editors
Living people
University of Belgrade Faculty of Economics alumni
Vogue (magazine) people
Writers from New York City
Year of birth missing (living people)
Serbian film directors
Film directors from New York City